Sogod, officially the Municipality of Sogod,  is a 4th class municipality in the province of Cebu, Philippines. According to the 2020 census, it has a population of 39,447 people.

Geography

Barangays
Sogod comprises 18 barangays:

Climate

Demographics

Tourism
St. James the Great Parish
Bagatayam Falls
Binaliw Cold Spring

References

External links

 [ Philippine Standard Geographic Code]

Municipalities of Cebu